Schools in Basingstoke and Deane.

State funded

Children's Centres
All centres are run by SureStart
 Honeycomb Children's Centre
 Octopus Children's Centre
 Pebbles Children's Centre
 Westside Children's Centre
 Buttercups Children's Centre

Primary/First Schools

 Ashford Hill Primary School
 Bishopswood Infant School
 Bishopswood Junior School
 Bramley Church of England Primary School
 Burghclere Primary School
 Burnham Copse Primary School
 Castle Hill Primary School
 Castle Hill Infant School
 Chalk Ridge Primary School
 Chiltern Primary School
 Chineham Park Primary School
 Cliddesden Primary School
 Ecchinswell and Sydmonton C E Primary School 
 Fairfields Primary School
 Four Lanes Community Junior School
 Four Lanes Infant School
 Great Binfields Primary School
 Hatch Warren Infant School
 Hatch Warren Junior School
 Kempshott Infant School
 Kempshott Junior School
 Kingsley Church of England Primary School
 Kings Furlong Infant School and Nursery
 Kings Furlong Junior School
 Manor Field Infant School
 Manor Field Junior School
 Marnel Community Infant School
 Merton Infant School
 Merton Junior School
 North Waltham Primary School
 Oakley Church Of England Junior School
 Oakley Infant School
 Oakridge Infant School
 Oakridge Junior School
 Old Basing Infant School
 Overton C E Primary School
 Park View Infant School
 Park View Junior School
 Preston Candover Church Of England Primary School
 The Priory Primary School
 Rucstall Primary School
 Sherborne St John Church Of England Primary School
 Silchester Church Of England Primary School
 South View Infant School
 South View Junior School
 St Anne's Catholic Voluntary Aided Primary School
 St Bede's Catholic Voluntary Aided Primary School
 St John's Church Of England Voluntary Aided Primary School
 St Mark's Church Of England Primary School
 St Martin's East Woodhay C E Voluntary Aided Primary School
 St Mary Bourne Primary School
 St Mary's Church Of England Junior School, Old Basing
 St Thomas' Church Of England Infant School, Woolton Hill
 Tadley Community Primary School
 Whitchurch C E Primary School
 Winklebury Infant School
 Winklebury Junior School
 Woolton Hill Junior School

Secondary schools
 Aldworth School
 Bishop Challoner Catholic Secondary School
 Brighton Hill Community School
 The Clere School And Technology College
 The Costello School
 Cranbourne School
 Everest Community Academy
 The Hurst School
 Testbourne Community School
 The Vyne Community School

Special Schools
 Coppice Spring Academy
 Dove House School
 Limington House School
 Maple Ridge School
 Saxon Wood School

Independent schools

Primary/First Schools
 Daneshill School

Independent Special Schools
 The Loddon School

Independent Primary/Secondary Schools
 Sherfield School
 The Costello School

Further education colleges
 Queen Mary's College
 Basingstoke College of Technology

References

Schools in Hampshire
Hampshire
Basingstoke and Deane
Lists of buildings and structures in Hampshire